All Access may refer to:

 "All Access" (CSI: NY), an episode of CSI: NY
 All Access Mzansi, a show on the M-Net network in South Africa
 Paramount+, formerly known as CBS All Access, an over-the-top streaming service operated by the ViacomCBS
 UFC All Access, a reality TV show
 VH1: All Access, a series of TV music specials

See also 
 All Access Europe, a 2002 video album by Eminem
 All Access Pass, a comedy TV program
 All Access Pass (video), a music DVD by Hilary Duff
 All Access to All Things, a 2003 DVD by Mudvayne